Meet Mr. Lucifer is a black-and-white British comedy satire film released in 1953 starring Stanley Holloway. It was filmed at Ealing Studios, London, and is one of the Ealing comedies. The film is based on the play Beggar My Neighbour by Arnold Ridley (who later played Private Godfrey in the BBC television comedy series Dad's Army). The film opened on 26 November 1953 at the Haymarket Gaumont cinema in London.

The overall scenario is that a television set makes people act out of character, with visible encouragement from the Devil in human form.

Plot
When Mr Pedelty leaves his firm, he is given a television set as a retirement present. At first, he enjoys all the attention from his neighbours, but soon the attraction wears off, and he sells it on to a young married couple the Nortons, living in the flat above him. They soon encounter the same problems, and again the set is passed on to several different characters all with the same results.

The set passes to the chemist Hector McPhee who falls in love with "The Lonely Hearts Singer" on a television programme. At first he has the same dour character as his maiden aunt, Miss MacPherson. At first, the set improves his character, but as his obsession grows, he becomes increasingly angry at any interruption.

Cast
 Stanley Holloway as Sam Hollingsworth / Mr. Lucifer
 Peggy Cummins as Kitty Norton
 Jack Watling as Jim Norton
 Barbara Murray as Patricia Pedelty
 Joseph Tomelty as Mr. Pedelty
 Kay Kendall as Lonely Hearts Singer
 Gordon Jackson as Hector McPhee
 Charles Victor as Mr. Elder
 Humphrey Lestocq as Arthur
 Jean Cadell as Mrs. Macdonald
 Raymond Huntley as Mr. Patterson
 Ernest Thesiger as Mr. Macdonald
 Frank Pettingell as Mr. Roberts
 Olive Sloane as Mrs. Stannard
 Gilbert Harding as Himself
 Philip Harben as Himself
 McDonald Hobley as Himself
David Miller as Himself
Olga Gwynne as Principal Boy
 Joan Sims as Fairy Queen
 Ian Carmichael as Man Friday
 Irene Handl as Lady with Dog
 Gladys Henson as Lady in Bus
 Roddy Hughes as Billings
 Eliot Makeham as Edwards
 Bill Fraser as Band Leader
 Dandy Nichols as Mrs. Clarke
 Toke Townley as Trumpet Player
 Fred Griffiths as Removal Man

References

External links
 
 Meet Mr. Lucifer film review at Timeout
 
 
 

1953 films
1953 comedy films
British comedy films
Ealing Studios films
Films directed by Anthony Pelissier
Films set in London
British films based on plays
Films about television
British black-and-white films
1950s English-language films
1950s British films